Ragtime Cowboy Joe is a 1940 American Western film directed by Ray Taylor and written by Sherman L. Lowe. The film stars Johnny Mack Brown, Fuzzy Knight, Nell O'Day, Dick Curtis, Lynn Merrick and Walter Soderling. The film was released on September 20, 1940, by Universal Pictures.

Plot

Cast        
Johnny Mack Brown as Steve Logan
Fuzzy Knight as Joe Bushberry
Nell O'Day as Helen Osborne
Dick Curtis as Bo Gilman
Lynn Merrick as Mary Curtiss 
Walter Soderling as Virgil Parker
Roy Barcroft as Putt Lewis
Harry Tenbrook as Del Porter
George Plues as Roy Gordon
Ed Cassidy as Sheriff
Buck Moulton as Buck Edwards
Harold Goodwin as Duncan
Wilfred Lucas as Sam Osborne
William Gould as Mansfield
Bob O'Connor as Bartender
Bud Osborne as Clements
Slim Whitaker as Foreman 
Jack Rube Clifford as Clayton 
Veola Vonn as Singer

References

External links
 

1940 films
American Western (genre) films
1940 Western (genre) films
Universal Pictures films
Films directed by Ray Taylor
American black-and-white films
1940s English-language films
1940s American films